Gaspard-Théodore-Ignace de la Fontaine (6 January 1787 – 11 February 1871) was a Luxembourgish politician and jurist.  He led the Orangist movement and was the first Prime Minister of Luxembourg, serving for four months, from 1 August 1848 until 6 December of the same year.

From 1807 to 1810 he studied law in Paris and in the same year became a lawyer in Luxembourg City. In 1816 he became a member of the États provinciaux. When the Belgian Revolution broke out, he supported William I, and was appointed to the government commission that controlled Luxembourg City.

From 1841 to 1848 he was the governor of the Grand-Duchy. On 1 August 1848 he became the first head of government of Luxembourg and was also responsible for the areas of foreign affairs, justice, and culture. The government fell on 2 December 1849. De la Fontaine was from 1849 to 1851 a member of the council of Luxembourg City. In 1857 he was appointed the first president of the newly established Council of State, which he remained for 11 years.

His third son, Edmond, better known by his pen name 'Dicks', became Luxembourg's national poet, and one of the fathers of Luxembourgian literature. His two other sons were the botanist Léon de la Fontaine and the zoologist Alphonse de la Fontaine.

Honours

Knight of the "Lion néerlandais"
Grand Cross of the Order of the Oak Crown
Commander of the Order of Leopold

See also

Fontaine Ministry

Notes

References 
 

|-

|-

|-

Prime Ministers of Luxembourg
Ministers for Foreign Affairs of Luxembourg
Ministers for Justice of Luxembourg
Councillors in Luxembourg City
Presidents of the Council of State of Luxembourg
Members of the Council of State of Luxembourg
Independent politicians in Luxembourg
Luxembourgian Orangists
19th-century Luxembourgian lawyers
1787 births
1871 deaths
People from Luxembourg City
Alumni of the Athénée de Luxembourg